Philip Crowther is a British–German–Luxembourgish journalist, notable for being a polyglot. He has publicly spoken in fluent French, Spanish, Portuguese, English, German, and Luxembourgish. He is the White House correspondent for France 24, international affiliate correspondent for the Associated Press, and is a member of the White House Correspondents' Association.

Early life and education
Crowther was born in Luxembourg to a British father and German mother. His father and mother spoke only English and German to him, respectively. He was educated in Luxembourg at the Athénée de Luxembourg, so he is as fluent as anyone in the country in all four languages: French, German, English and Luxembourgish. At the age of 14, he started learning Spanish out of an interest in Spanish football. During a gap year after high school, he went to Barcelona where he learned some Catalan. He learned Portuguese at university, studying at King's College London where he graduated with Hispanic Studies.

Career
In 2006, he worked as a sports reporter for the Uruguayan newspaper El País. From 2007 to 2008, he majored in Broadcast Journalism at the University of the Arts, London as a graduate student. From 2008 to 2011, he worked as a reporter for France 24 in Paris.

Since June 2011, he has been based in Washington, D.C., and has traveled to other regions and countries to cover breaking news.

In 2018, he joined the Associated Press' Global Media Services as an "international affiliate  correspondent", a position tailored specifically for him. He provides live coverage in six languages to broadcasters around the world.

On 25 May 2021, the one year anniversary of the murder of George Floyd, Crowther was reporting live from the scene of the killing when gunfire erupted. He was unharmed. In 2020, he was invited to become a member to the International Association of Hyperpolyglots (HYPIA) in recognition of his multilingual reporting, and on June 1, 2021 he became a member.

In February 2022, he reported from Kyiv in six different languages during coverage of the Russian-Ukrainian conflict which brought him mainstream attention and gained him 70,000 more Twitter followers.

Awards 
The Professional Excellence Award, by the Association of Foreign Press Correspondents in the USA (2021)

Personal life
Crowther's parents live in Luxembourg and his sister lives in Germany. He has a daughter. He became a Luxembourg citizen in 2019, when his father, a British citizen acquired the citizenship before Brexit.

References

External links

Philip Crowther at France 24
Six-language coverage from #Kyiv with @AP_GMS. In this order: English, Luxembourgish, Spanish, Portuguese, French, and German. on Twitter

Living people
1981 births
British journalists
Luxembourgian journalists
German journalists
Alumni of the Athénée de Luxembourg
Alumni of King's College London
British people of German descent
German people of British descent
Luxembourgian people of British descent
Luxembourgian people of German descent